Macca is a common nickname in some English speaking countries for somebody whose surname begins with the Gaelic prefix Mac or Mc (meaning "son"). "Macca" is also a variant spelling of the Islamic holy city in Saudi Arabia officially known as Mecca in English. 

People frequently referred to as Macca include:

 Paul McCartney, English singer-songwriter, multi-instrumentalist, and composer
 Chris McCormack (triathlete), Australian professional triathlete, two time ironman world champion
 Amy Macdonald, Scottish singer-songwriter, guitarist, and recording artist
 Andrew McLeod, Australian rules footballer and two-time Norm Smith Medallist
 Steve McManaman, English footballer sometimes also called 'El Macca'
 Stephen McPhail, Irish footballer
 Gary McAllister, Scottish footballer and manager
 Gary McSheffrey, English footballer
 Steve McMahon, former English footballer
 Bruce McAvaney, Australian Sports Media Broadcaster
 Neil McKenzie, South African Cricketer
 Paul McNamee, Australian Tennis Player and Sports Administrator
 Steve McNamara, British rugby league coach and former player
 Ian McNamara, Australian radio presenter

Other uses
 Macca Oromo, a clan-based subgroup of the Oromo people
 Macquarie Island, Australia
 McDonald's, nicknamed "Macca's" in Australia and New Zealand
 McLaren, a Formula One Grand Prix team based in Woking, England
 Michael "Macca" MacKenzie, fictional recurring character on the Australian soap opera Home and Away
 Macca is the currency in the Megami Tensei series; see Shin Megami Tensei IV

See also

 Mac (disambiguation)
 Maca (disambiguation)
 Makar
 Makka (disambiguation)
 Mecca (disambiguation)
 Machair